Mulana Assembly constituency is one of the 90 assembly seats of Haryana. It is located in Ambala district.

Members of Legislative Assembly

See also
Ambala district
List of constituencies of the Haryana Legislative Assembly

References

External links 
 Ambala City

Ambala
Assembly constituencies of Haryana